Bengt "Zamora" Nyholm (30 January 1930 – 10 September 2015) was a Swedish footballer who played as a goalkeeper. He was awarded the Guldbollen Award in 1961.

Honours 
IFK Norrköping
 Allsvenskan: 1951–52, 1955–56, 1956–57, 1960, 1962, 1963

Individual
 Guldbollen: 1961

References

External links

1930 births
2015 deaths
Swedish footballers
Association football goalkeepers
Sweden international footballers
IFK Norrköping players
People from Härnösand
Sportspeople from Västernorrland County